Natalie Melmore married name Natalie Chestney (born 28 July 1989, in Torquay) is a lawn bowler from Newton Abbot.

Bowls career
Natalie represented England at the 2010 Commonwealth Games where she won a gold medal in the women's singles event. In 2011 she won the singles and triples silver medals at the Atlantic Bowls Championships.

Natalie went on to win a further two silver medals in the 2014 Commonwealth Games in the women's singles and women's pairs events with partner Jamie-Lea Winch.

In 2016 she secured a fourth and fifth National title win and in 2018 was part of the fours that won the National Championships. After her 2014 singles success she subsequently won the singles at the British Isles Bowls Championships in 2015.

She was selected as part of the English team for the 2018 Commonwealth Games on the Gold Coast in Queensland. In 2019 she won the singles and pairs bronze medals at the Atlantic Bowls Championships.

In 2022, she competed in the women's triples and the Women's fours at the 2022 Commonwealth Games. She won the gold medal in the triples with Jamie-Lea Winch and Sian Honnor.

Personal life
In 2015, she married Jamie Chestney.

References

Living people
1989 births
Bowls players at the 2010 Commonwealth Games
Bowls players at the 2014 Commonwealth Games
Bowls players at the 2018 Commonwealth Games
Bowls players at the 2022 Commonwealth Games
Commonwealth Games gold medallists for England
English female bowls players
Sportspeople from Torquay
People from Newton Abbot
Commonwealth Games silver medallists for England
Commonwealth Games medallists in lawn bowls
Medallists at the 2010 Commonwealth Games
Medallists at the 2014 Commonwealth Games